2021 in men's road cycling includes the 2021 men's bicycle races governed by the Union Cycliste Internationale. The races are part of the UCI Road Calendar.

World Championships

The Road World Championships are set to be held in Flanders, Belgium from 18–26 September 2021.

Olympics

The 2020 Summer Olympics were originally scheduled to be held in Tokyo, Japan in July and August 2020. Due to the COVID-19 pandemic, the games were postponed to 23 July – 8 August 2021.

Grand Tours

UCI World Tour

UCI ProSeries

Championships

National Championships

UCI Teams

UCI WorldTeams
The following nineteen teams have received a UCI WorldTour license for the 2021 season.

UCI ProTeams and Continental Teams

Notes

References

 

Men's road cycling by year